The Office of Telecommunications (Oftel) (the telecommunications regulator) was a department in the United Kingdom government, under civil service control, charged with promoting competition and maintaining the interests of consumers in the UK telecommunications market. It was set up under the Telecommunications Act 1984 after privatisation of the nationalised operator BT.

Oftel was accused by critics such as Freeserve of having been "captured" by BT, and of giving the dominant operator too much freedom to leverage its monopoly status in fixed line telephony into other markets such as ADSL.

On 29 December 2003, the duties of Oftel were inherited by Ofcom, which was the result of the consolidation of five separate British telecommunications, radio spectrum and broadcasting regulators.

Director-General of Oftel
Bryan Carsberg 1 August 1984 – 12 June 1992
Bill Wigglesworth (acting) 13 June 1992 – 31 March 1998
Donald Cruickshank 1 April 1993 – 31 March 1998
David Edmonds 1 April 1998 – 29 December 2003

See also
UK Telephone area (STD) codes
UK topics

Notes

Communications authorities
History of telecommunications in the United Kingdom
Information technology organisations based in the United Kingdom
Regulators of the United Kingdom
Telecommunications organisations in the United Kingdom